Renin may refer to:
 Renin-e Bozorg
 Renin-e Kuchek